Bigg Boss is an Indian Malayalam-language non-scripted reality television game show produced by Endemol Shine India, now owned by Banijay, and broadcast on Asianet. It is an adaptation of the reality TV franchise of the same name, which is an adaptation of the Dutch reality TV franchise "Big Brother" developed by Endemol in the Netherlands. "Bigg Boss" broadcast on Asianet, yearly since 2018, the show follows the format of other national editions, in which a group of contestants, known as "housemates", live together in a specially constructed house that is isolated from the outside world. They are continuously monitored by live television cameras and personal audio microphones. Throughout the competition, housemates are "evicted" from the house by public televoting. The last remaining housemate wins the competition and a cash prize. Mohanlal has been hosting the show since the first season began on June 24, 2018. The series is available on Disney+ Hotstar around the clock.

Season 1 concluded on September 30, 2018, with Sabumon Abdusamad being declared the winner. Season 2 premiered on January 5, 2020, but after 75 days, the season was suspended on March 20, 2020, as a result of COVID-19 pandemic in India, and all participants were sent home without a season winner. Season 3 of Bigg Boss premiered on February 14, 2021, but was halted again on May 20, 2021, due to the COVID-19 pandemic in India. The finale, however, was shot independently days after the show was cancelled, and Manikkuttan was announced as the season's winner. Season 4 of Bigg Boss premiered on March 27, 2022, and concluded on July 3, 2022. Dilsha Prasannan was declared the winner, becoming the first female title holder in Bigg Boss Malayalam history.  

Season 5 will Launch On 26 March 2023.

Overview 
Bigg Boss is a Malayalam-language version of the reality TV franchise Bigg Boss, which is based on the original Dutch Big Brother format developed by John de Mol Jr. The show follows selected number of contestants, known as housemates, who are isolated from the outside world for 100 days (or 15 weeks) in a custom-built house. The housemates are continuously monitored during their stay in the house by live television cameras as well as personal audio microphones. They are dictated to by an omnipresent entity named Bigg Boss. Each week, one or more of the housemates are evicted by a public vote (Bigg boss sponsored contestants are exempted from the public vote, It is Bigg boss interest to protect the sponsored contestants by putting them in a secret room or by giving re-entry to ensure the chances of winning.). Several contestants (known as "housemates") live in a purpose-built house and are isolated from the rest of the world. Each week, housemates nominate two of their fellow housemates for eviction, and the housemates who receive the most nominations would face a public vote. Eventually, one housemate would leave after being "evicted" from the House. In the final week, there will be five housemates remaining, and the public will vote for who they wanted to win. Unlike other versions of Big Brother, the Malayalam version uses celebrities as housemates, not members of the general public.

House
The house is well-furnished and decorated. It has various modern amenities, but just two bedrooms, a living area, kitchen, storeroom, smoking room, and four toilet bathrooms. There is a garden, pool, activity area, and gym in the House. There is also a Confession Room, where the housemates may be called in by Bigg Boss for any kind of conversation, and the nomination process. The House has no TV connection, no telephones, and no Internet connection.

Rules 
They are not supposed to tamper with any of the electronic equipment or any other thing in the House. They are not allowed to write using paper, books, or anything else in the house. They cannot leave the House premises at any time except when they are permitted to. They cannot discuss the nomination process with anyone. They cannot sleep in the daytime, are required to wear their mic all the time, and speak only in Malayalam.

Sometimes, the housemates may be nominated for other reasons, such as nomination by a person who has achieved special privileges (via tasks or other things), for breaking rules, or something else. If something very serious happens, a contestant may be evicted immediately. All the rules have never been told to the audience, however, the most prominent ones are seen. The housemates are not permitted to speak in any other language except Malayalam.

Broadcast 
Bigg Boss is aired on Asianet. Every day's episodes contain the main happenings of the previous day. Every weekend episodes(Saturday and Sunday) mainly show the discussion of the Host (MohanLal) with other housemates and about the previous week, following a discussion about elimination.

Eviction
Contestants are nominated every week by their housemates. Viewers cast their vote in favor of the contestants they would like to save from eviction. The contestant with the fewest votes is evicted from the house.

Series overview

Housemate pattern

References

External links 
 Official Website on Hotstar
 Bigg Boss Season 2 called off
 Bigg Boss Malayalam Season 5 Coming Soon

Indian reality television series
Indian game shows
2018 Indian television series debuts
Indian television series based on non-Indian television series
Asianet (TV channel) original programming
Malayalam-language television shows